Tha Hall of Game is the third studio album by American rapper E-40, released October 27, 1996, on Jive and Sick Wid It Records. The album features production by Ant Banks, Mike Mosley, Rick Rock, Studio Ton and Tone Capone. It peaked at number 2 on the Billboard Top R&B/Hip-Hop Albums and at number 4 on the Billboard 200. One single, "Things'll Never Change"/"Rapper's Ball", peaked at number 19 on the Billboard Hot R&B/Hip-Hop Songs. and performed well on several other charts as well. The album was certified gold in 1997 by the RIAA. The album features guest performances by fellow members of The Click: B-Legit, D-Shot and Suga-T, as well as 2Pac, Luniz, Cold 187um, Kokane, Keak da Sneak and Levitti.

Along with the single, a music video was produced for the song, "Rapper's Ball", featuring Too Short and K-Ci and features cameo appearances by 2Pac, Ice-T and Mack 10. A second single, "Things'll Never Change", was also released as a music video, featuring Bo-Roc of The Dove Shack.

Track listing

Samples
"Ring It" contains sample of "Telephone Bill" by Johnny Guitar Watson and "187 Proof" by Spice 1.
"I Wanna Thank You" contains sample of "I Want to Thank You" by Alicia Myers and "Ready for Your Love" by Mtume. 
"Rappers' Ball" contains sample of "Playboy Short" by Too Short.
"The Story" contains sample of "Friends" by Whodini and "Paul Revere" by Beastie Boys. 
"Things'll Never Change" contains sample of "Here We Go (Live at the Funhouse)" by Run-DMC and "The Way It Is" by Bruce Hornsby and the Range. 
"Smebbin'" contains sample of "Da Bumble" by E-40 and "Learn About It" by The Click.

Charts

Weekly charts

Weekly charts

Certifications

References

E-40 albums
1996 albums
Albums produced by Ant Banks
Albums produced by Rick Rock
Albums produced by Studio Ton
Jive Records albums
Sick Wid It Records albums
Gangsta rap albums by American artists